This is a complete list of Armenian chess title-holders as of January 2010.

Grandmasters

International Masters

Women Grandmasters

Women International Masters

See also
Chess in Armenia
List of Armenians
List of chess players

External links
Elo rating list of top 100 Armenian chess players
Armenian Chess Players
BBC iPlayer - Assignment Armenia the cleverest nation on earth

 
Armenian
Chess players
Chess in Armenia